UAAP Season 77 is the 2014–15 athletic year of the University Athletic Association of the Philippines (UAAP). The season host is the University of the East with Carmelita Mateo as president. Eight universities are competing in fifteen sports to vie for the general championship. Each sporting event is hosted by a school.

Some of these sporting events are aired live or on a delayed telecast by ABS-CBN Sports+Action and ABS-CBN Channel 2. All the men's basketball games and the women's volleyball games are aired live by ABS-CBN Sports, the former for the fifteenth consecutive year following the renewal of the contract for the broadcast of the games and the latter since Season 69 (2006−07).

Opening ceremony
Season 77 kicked off at 12:30 P.M. on Saturday, July 12, 2014 at the Smart Araneta Coliseum with University of the East (UE) as the host school. This year's theme was "Unity in Excellence".  Eight huge spheres were hanged from the ceiling of the coliseum representing the different universities united in the pursuit of excellence.

The opening ceremony featured a parade of the "constellations," with students portraying legendary figures from Greek mythology such as Zeus, Andromeda, Pegasus and Orion. Team captains of the basketball teams of the eight participating schools were introduced riding on Segways. UE Red Warriors team captain Bong Galanza led the oath of sportsmanship.

A basketball double header followed after the opening ceremonies. Host school UE took on the  UP Fighting Maroons, while the defending champion De La Salle Green Archers was pitted against the FEU Tamaraws.

Sports calendar

Basketball

Seniors division
The UAAP Season 77 seniors division basketball tournament began on July 12, 2014. The tournament main venue was the Smart Araneta Coliseum in Cubao, Quezon City and the secondary venue was the Mall of Asia Arena in Pasay, Metro Manila. The tournament host was University of the East and the tournament commissioner was Andy Jao.

The UAAP Season 77 juniors division basketball tournament started on November 29, 2014. The UAAP Board decided to move the juniors division basketball tournament from the 1st semester to the 2nd semester to give way to the players participating in the 2014 FIBA Asia Under-18 Championship tournament. The NU Bullpups were the defending champions.

Men's tournament

Elimination round

Team standings

Playoffs

Awards
 Most Valuable Player: 
 Rookie of the Year:

Women's tournament

Elimination round

Team standings

Playoffs

Awards
 Most Valuable Player: 
 Rookie of the Year:

Juniors division
The UAAP Season 77 juniors division basketball tournament started on November 29, 2014. The tournament main venue is the Ateneo Blue Eagle gym in Katipunan Avenue, Loyola Heights, Quezon City. The tournament host is the University of the East.

Elimination round

Team standings

Playoffs

Awards
 Most Valuable Player: 
 Rookie of the Year:

Volleyball

Seniors' division
The UAAP Season 77 seniors' division volleyball tournament started on November 22, 2014 at the Mall of Asia Arena in Pasay, Metro Manila. Opening-day games were the women's teams of UE vs UST at 2 PM and Ateneo vs NU at 4 PM. The tournament main venue is the Filoil Flying V Arena in  San Juan City while selected games will be played at the Smart Araneta Coliseum in Cubao, Quezon City, and the Mall of Asia Arena in Pasay. Tournament commissioner was Rustico "Otie" Camangian.

The UAAP Season 77 high school volleyball tournament started on July 26, 2014. The tournament venue was the Adamson University Gym in San Marcelino St., Ermita, Manila. The number of participating schools in the boys' and girls' tournaments both increased to seven. Far Eastern University fielded boys' and girls' volleyball teams this season. Since there are now seven participating schools, the tournaments will have a Final Four format. The UAAP Board decided to move the high school volleyball tournaments from 2nd semester to 1st semester due to the basketball juniors tournament being moved from the 1st semester to 2nd semester.

The tournament host for volleyball was University of the East.

Men's tournament

Elimination round

Playoffs

Awards
 Most Valuable Player: 
 Rookie of the Year:

Women's tournament

Elimination round

Playoffs

Awards
 Most Valuable Player: 
 Rookie of the Year:  and

Juniors' division

Boys' tournament

Elimination round

Playoffs

Awards
 Most Valuable Player: 
 Rookie of the Year:

Girls' tournament

Elimination round

Playoffs

Awards
 Most Valuable Player: 
 Rookie of the Year:

Beach volleyball
The UAAP Season 77 beach volleyball tournament began on August 23, 2014. The tournament venue was  the University of the East (UE) sand courts in Caloocan, Metro Manila. Beach volleyball is a single round-robin elimination tournament. Adamson University was the tournament host.

Men's tournament

Elimination round

 Team standings

 Match-up results

Playoffs

Awards
 Most Valuable Player: 
 Rookie of the Year:

Women's tournament

Elimination round

 Team standings

 Match-up results

Playoffs

Awards
 Most Valuable Player: 
 Rookie of the Year:

Football

The UAAP Season 77 seniors division football tournament started on November 29, 2014 with a double header in the men's tournament at the Moro Lorenzo Football Field of Ateneo de Manila University in Katipunan Ave., Loyola Heights, Quezon City. UP will face off against La Salle at 4pm, while Ateneo will go against UE at 6pm.

The number of participating schools increased to eight in the men's division. Adamson University fielded a men's team. Adamson made its return in men's football after more than a decade of absence. The tournament host is FEU.

Seniors division

Men's tournament

Elimination round

Team standings

Playoffs

Awards
 Most Valuable Player:  
 Rookie of the Year:

Women's tournament

Elimination round

Team standings

Final

Awards
 Most Valuable Player: 
 Rookie of the Year:

Juniors division

Boys' tournament
The UAAP Season 77 juniors division football tournament started on January 24, 2015 at the FEU-Diliman football field.

Elimination round

Team standings

Finals

Awards
 Most Valuable Player: 
 Rookie of the Year:

Baseball
The UAAP Season 77 baseball tournament began on January 25, 2015 at the Rizal Memorial Baseball Stadium in Malate Manila.

Men's tournament

Elimination round

 Team standings

 Match-up results

Scores
Results to the right and top of the gray cells are first round games, those to the left and below are second round games. Superscript is the number of innings played before the mercy rule applied.

Finals

Ateneo wins series 2-0

Awards
 Most Valuable Player: 
 Rookie of the Year:

Boys' tournament

Elimination round

Team standings

Match-up results

Scores
Results to the right and top of the gray cells are first round games, those to the left and below are second round games. Superscript is the number of innings played before the mercy rule applied.

Awards
 Most Valuable Player: 
 Rookie of the Year:

Softball
UAAP softball tournament opened on Jan. 24, 2015 at the Rizal Memorial Baseball Stadium in Malate Manila.

Women's tournament

Elimination round

Team standings

Match-up results

Scores
Results to the right and top of the gray cells are first round games, those to the left and below are second round games. Superscript is the number of innings played before the mercy rule applied.

Playoffs

Awards
 Most Valuable Player: 
 Rookie of the Year:

Badminton
The UAAP Season 77 badminton tournament began on August 9, 2014. The tournament venue was the Rizal Memorial Badminton Hall in Vito Cruz St., Malate, Manila. Badminton is a single round-robin elimination tournament. National University was the tournament host.

Men's tournament

Elimination round

 Team standings

 Match-up results

Playoffs

Awards
 Most Valuable Player: 
 Rookie of the Year:

Women's tournament

Elimination round

 Team standings

 Match-up results

Playoffs

Awards
 Most Valuable Player: 
 Rookie of the Year:

Table tennis
The UAAP Season 77 table tennis tournament began on September 13, 2014. The tournament venue was  the Blue Eagle Gym of the Ateneo de Manila University in Katipunan Ave., Loyola Heights, Quezon City. Ateneo de Manila University was the tournament host.

Seniors division

Men's tournament

Elimination round

 Team standings

 Match-up results

Playoffs

Awards
 Most Valuable Player: 
 Rookie of the Year:

Women's tournament

Elimination round

 Team standings

 Match-up results

Playoffs

Awards
 Most Valuable Player: 
 Rookie of the Year:

Juniors division

Boys' tournament

Elimination round

 Team standings

 Match-up results

Awards
 Most Valuable Player: 
 Rookie of the Year:

Taekwondo
The UAAP Season 77 taekwondo tournament began on September 9, 2014. The tournament venue was the Filoil Flying V Arena in San Juan City, Metro Manila. Taekwondo is a single round-robin elimination tournament. Far Eastern University was the tournament host.

Seniors division

Men's tournament

Elimination round

 Team standings

 Match-up results

Awards
 Most Valuable Player: 
 Rookie of the Year:

Women's tournament

Elimination round

 Team standings

Awards
 Most Valuable Player: 
 Rookie of the Year: 

 Match-up results

Juniors division

Boys' tournament

Elimination round

 Team standings

Awards
 Most Valuable Player: 
 Rookie of the Year:

 Match-up results

Chess 
The UAAP Season 77 chess tournament began on January 10, 2015 at the Henry Sy, Sr. Building in De La Salle University in Taft Avenue, Malate, Manila.

Seniors division

Men's tournament

Team standings

Match-up results

Results

Awards
 Most Valuable Player: 
 Rookie of the Year:

Women's tournament

Team standings

Match-up results

Results

Awards
 Most Valuable Player: 
 Rookie of the Year:

Juniors division

Boys' tournament

Team standings

Awards
 Most Valuable Player: 
 Rookie of the Year:

Judo 
The UAAP Season 77 Judo Championships ran from September 27–28, 2014 at the Blue Eagle Gym of the Ateneo de Manila University in Katipunan Ave., Loyola Heights, Quezon City. The tournament host was Ateneo de Manila University.

Seniors division

Men's tournament
 Team standings

Awards
 Most Valuable Player: 
 Rookie of the Year:

Women's tournament
 Team standings

Awards
 Most Valuable Player: 
 Rookie of the Year:

Juniors division

Boys' tournament
 Team standings

Awards
 Most Valuable Player: 
 Rookie of the Year:

Swimming
The UAAP Season 77 Swimming Championships was held on October 2–5, 2014 at the Rizal Memorial Swimming Pool in Vito Cruz St., Malate, Manila. The tournament host was National University.

Team ranking is determined by a point system, similar to that of the overall championship. The points given are based on the swimmer's/team's finish in the finals of an event, which include only the top eight finishers from the preliminaries. The gold medalist(s) receive 15 points, silver gets 12, bronze has 10. The following points: 8, 6, 4, 2 and 1 are given to the rest of the participating swimmers/teams according to their order of finish.

Seniors division

Men's tournament
Team standings
 
Rec - Number of new swimming records established

Awards
 Most Valuable Player: 
 Rookie of the Year:

Women's tournament
Team standings

Rec - Number of new swimming records established

Awards
 Most Valuable Player: 
 Rookie of the Year:

Juniors division

Boys' tournament
Team standings

Rec - Number of new swimming records established

Awards
 Most Valuable Player: 
 Rookie of the Year:

Girls' tournament
Team standings

Rec - Number of new swimming records established

Awards
 Most Valuable Player: 
 Rookie of the Year:

Track and field 
UAAP Season 77 track and field was held on December 6, 7, 9, and 10, 2014 at the Philsports Track and Field Oval in Pasig. The tournament host was De La Salle University.

Team ranking is determined by a point system, similar to that of the overall championship. The gold medalist receives 15 points, silver gets 12, bronze has 10. The following points: 8, 6, 4, 2 and 1 are given to the rest of the participating swimmers/teams according to their order of finish.

Men's tournament
Team standings
 
Rec - Number of new athletic records established

Awards
 Most Valuable Player: 
 Rookie of the Year:

Women's tournament
Team standings
 
Rec - Number of new athletic records established

Awards
 Most Valuable Player: 
 Rookie of the Year:

Special events

Cheerdance
The UAAP Season 77 cheerdance competition was held on September 14, 2014 at the Smart Araneta Coliseum in Cubao, Quezon City. Cheerdance competition is an exhibition event. Points for the overall championship are not awarded to the participating schools.

Team standings
 
Order refers to order of performance.

 Stunner award: Camille Isabel Lagmay (University of the Philippines)

Group stunts competition

Street dance
The 4th UAAP Street Dance Competition was held on February 8, 2015 at Mall of Asia Arena in Pasay. Street dance competition is an exhibition event. Points for the general championship are not awarded to the participants.

Host team in boldface.

General championship summary 
The general champion is determined by a point system. The system gives 15 points to the champion team of a UAAP event, 12 to the runner-up, and 10 to the third placer. The following points: 8, 6, 4, 2 and 1 are given to the rest of the participating teams according to their order of finish.

Medals table

Seniors' division

Juniors' division

General championship tally

Seniors' division

Juniors' division

Individual awards
 Athlete of the Year:
 Seniors: 
 
 
 
 Juniors:

See also 
 NCAA Season 90

References

 
2014 in Philippine sport
2015 in Philippine sport
77